is a 2012 South Korean television series that was jointly produced by Korean and Japanese companies. It aired on Japan's TBS-cable affiliate TBS Channel 2, and South Korean cable channel SBS Plus.

The term "sequel" is used loosely, since the series only shares the same premise as Won Soo-yeon's manhwa and the original 2004 hit Full House, but has a completely different set of characters and plot.

Plot
A hapkido teacher named Jang Man-ok (Hwang Jung-eum; Man-ok means "full house" in Hanja) poses as a stylist for top idol group TAKE ONE and moves into the band's luxurious house, which superstar musician Lee Tae-ik (No Min-woo) inherited from his father. A love triangle emerges as Lee vies against fellow band member Won Kang-hwi (Park Ki-woong) for Jang’s affection.

Cast

Main characters
Hwang Jung-eum as Jang Man-ok / Michelle Jang
Roh Jeong-eui as young Man-ok
No Min-woo as Lee Tae-ik
Oh Jae-moo as teenage Tae-ik
Ahn Do-gyu as young Tae-ik
Park Ki-woong as Won Kang-hwi
Jung Yoon-seok as young Kang-hwi
Yoo Seol-ah as Jin Se-ryung

Supporting characters
Kim Byung-se as Hwang Bum-soo
Lee Seung-hyo as Bae Go-dong
Lee Hoon as Lee Joon
Jang Hang-sun as Man-ok's grandfather
Yang Han-yeol as Mon-ok's student	
Han Yeo-wool as secretary
Kim Do-yun as Han Ga-ryun
Yoo Tae-woong
Song Min-hyung
Oh Na-mi as stylist Choi
Jung Ji-ah
Lee Shin-ae
Heo Jae-ho
Zi Liu

Guests 
 Jo Jae-yoon as Korean-Chinese taxi driver.

References

External links
 Full House Take 2 official SBS Plus website  
 Full House Take 2 official TBS website 
 
 

2012 South Korean television series debuts
2012 South Korean television series endings
Seoul Broadcasting System television dramas
Korean-language television shows
Television shows based on manhwa
Television series by Kim Jong-hak Production